Keeping is a surname. Notable people with the surname include:

 Charles Keeping (1924–1988), British illustrator, children's book author and lithographer
 Damien Keeping (born 1982), Australian rules football coach
 Frederick Keeping (1867–1950), British racing cyclist
 Jack Keeping (born 1996), English cricketer
 Janet Keeping, leader of the Green Party of Alberta
 Jeff Keeping (born 1982), Canadian Football League defensive tackle
 Max Keeping (1942–2015), Canadian television news anchor
 Michael Keeping (1902–1984), English footballer and manager (son of Frederick Keeping)
 Tom Keeping (born 1942), Canadian politician
 Walter Keeping (1854–1888), British geologist and museum curator

See also
 
 Keep (disambiguation)
 Keeper (disambiguation)
 Keepers (disambiguation)